Väsen is a Swedish folk music band from Uppsala, founded in 1989, consisting of Olov Johansson (nyckelharpa) and Mikael Marin (viola). Previous members include André Ferrari (percussion) and founding member Roger Tallroth (guitar), the latter of whom announced his departure from the band in 2020 to focus on new projects.  they have released 20 albums, featured on others, and have toured every year also outside of Europe. Since 2002, however, performances outside Sweden have tended to not include André Ferrari, owing to his reluctance to tour internationally and the economic advantage of a trio. Since then, Väsen has released eight albums (Trio, Keyed Up, Live in Japan, Väsen Street, Mindset, Live på Gamla Bion, Brewed, & Rule of 3) in this “strings-only” format.

The band played on Nordman's debut album in 1994. On the Finnish group JPP's album String Tease, they were guest artists on two of the tracks.

They also regularly play with the American musicians Mike Marshall (mandolin) and Darol Anger (violin).

History 

The band was founded in 1989.

Members 

 Olov Johansson (nyckelharpa)
 Mikael Marin (viola)
 André Ferrari (percussion; former)
 Roger Tallroth (guitar; former)

Discography
 Väsen, 1990
 Vilda Väsen, 1992
 Essence, 1994
 Levande Väsen (Live), 1995
 Spirit, 1997 (Compilation: 15 tracks from the first four albums, plus 5 new tracks)
 Världens Väsen (Whirled), 1997
 Gront, 1999
 Live at the Nordic Roots Festival, 2001
 Trio, 2003
 Keyed Up, 2004
 Live in Japan, 2005
 Linnaeus Väsen, 2007
 Mike Marshall and Darol Anger with Väsen, 2007
 Väsen Street, 2009
 Mindset, 2013
 Live på Gamla Bion (CD + DVD), 2014
 Brewed, 2017
 Rule of 3, 2019
 Duo, 2021

Featured Performances
 Snarky Puppy Family Dinner – Volume 2 - “I Asked” feat. Becca Stevens and Väsen (Track 1), 2016
 Snarky Puppy Family Dinner – Volume 2 - “Be Still” feat. Becca Stevens and Väsen (Track 9), 2016
 Snarky Puppy Family Dinner – Volume 2 - “Shapons Vindaloo” feat. Väsen (Track 11), 2016

References

External links
Official home page

Swedish folk music groups
Musical groups from Uppsala